Synaphe chellalalis is a species of moth of the family Pyralidae described by George Hampson in 1900. It is found in Spain, Portugal and Algeria.

Taxonomy
Synaphe predotalis is sometimes treated as a subspecies of Synaphe chellalalis.

References

Moths described in 1900
Pyralini